Wumahe District was a district of the prefecture-level city of Yichun, Heilongjiang province, China.

Notes and references

See also

External links
  Government site - 

Wumahe